The Tirana–Elbasan Highway is a four-lane highway in central Albania and part of the A3 motorway opened to traffic on 16 June 2013, and completed in the summer of 2019.

Financing

$223M from the Islamic Bank for Reconstruction has partly financed the road construction.
The total construction cost is calculated at $400M. Other banks financing the highway are the OPEC fund, the Abu Dhabi fund, and the Saudi Fund for development.

Characteristics and Krrabë tunnel
The most important section consists  of the Krrabe Tunnel, whose length is about 4.9 km. The highway was opened to traffic when the construction of the entire route from Tirana to Elbasan was finalized as projected in June 2013 (18 months construction time). The highway was symbolically inaugurated by the former Albanian Prime Minister Sali Berisha on Sunday June 16, 2013. The highway was built without proper geological study resulting in the collapse of a hill section near Ibe. As a result, the completion of the highway was only finalized in the summer of 2019.

As of August 2016, the Tirane - TEG and Krrabe Tunnel - Elbasan segments were  fully functional. The Mullet - Ibe segment was only functional on one side of the highway while the TEG - Mullet and Ibe - Krrabe Tunnel segments were until summer 2019 under construction. Also, due to safety concerns, the Krrabe Tunnel was only opened to traffic to flow on one lane per direction.

References

National roads in Albania
Transport in Tirana County